The 2021–22 Oregon State Beavers women's basketball team represented Oregon State University during the 2021–22 NCAA Division I women's basketball season. The Beavers were led by twelfth-year head coach Scott Rueck, and they played their games at Gill Coliseum as members of the Pac-12 Conference.

Roster

Schedule

|-
!colspan=9 style=| Non-conference regular season

{{CBB schedule entry
| date           = December 17, 2021
| nonconf        = yes
| time           = 7:00pm
| tv             = Live Stream
| neutral        = yes
| opponent       = Idaho
| gamename       = Maui Jim Maui Classic Semifinals
| score          = 79–49
| record         = 6–3
| highscorer     = Kampschroeder
| points         = 16
| highrebounder  = | rebounds       = 7
| highassister   = Adams
| assists        = 7
| site_stadium   = Lahaina Civic Center
| attend         = 0
| site_cityst    = Lahaina, HI
}}

|-
!colspan=9 style=| Pac-12 regular season

|-
!colspan=9 style=|Pac-12 Women's Tournament

|-
!colspan=9 style=|WNIT

Source:

Rankings*The preseason and week 1 polls were the same.^Coaches did not release a week 2 poll.''

See also
 2021–22 Oregon State Beavers men's basketball team

Notes

References

Oregon State Beavers women's basketball seasons
Oregon State
Oregon State Beavers women's basketball
Oregon State Beavers women's basketball
Oregon State